Coire an t-Sneachda (sometimes misspelled as Coire an t'Sneachda) is a glacial cirque or corrie landform in the Cairngorm or  mountain range in the Grampian Mountains of the Scottish Highlands.

The summits of Cairn Lochan (1215 m) and Stob Coire an t-Sneachda (1176 m) lie above Coire an t-Sneachda's headwall.

Location and access

Coire an t-Sneachda is located in Invernesshire, Northern Scotland. The nearest major town is Aviemore.

Geology and wildlife

The country rock is the Caledonian granite of the Cairngorm batholith which gives rise to the high plateau from which the corrie was eroded.  The last glacier occupied this corrie or cirque approximately 10,000 to 11,000 years before present during the Younger Dryas stadial. This cold period, which is also known as the Loch Lomond stadial, was the last mini ice-age that brought glaciers and tundra conditions to the Scottish Highlands.

The corrie is home to a number of bird species, including ring ouzel and snow bunting (in the spring and summer) and ptarmigan (also known as rock ptarmigan) (all year round).

Climbing

The corrie is a popular destination for climbers, primarily because of its easy accessibility from the Cairn Gorm ski centre and the relatively reliable snow and ice conditions throughout the winter season.

A number of climbers have been killed in the corrie, attracting some media attention. Most notoriously, in the winter of 2007 five climbers died after falls or from exposure in adverse conditions during a two-month period. A member of the Cairngorms mountain MRT (Mountain Rescue Team) was quoted by BBC Scotland as stating, "... it may [be] down to a combination of factors such as how easily accessible the corrie is – it is about an hour's walk from the ski centre car park – people not having adequate equipment and poor climbing conditions".

References

External links
Geological information
Database of winter climbs from ukclimbing.com
"Death in the snow: why have five climbers been killed on one peak", Guardian
"Loch Lomond Stadial" article from Nature

Cirques of Europe
Munros
Badenoch and Strathspey
Climbing areas of Scotland